Events from the year 1915 in France.

Incumbents
President: Raymond Poincaré 
President of the Council of Ministers: René Viviani (until 29 October), Aristide Briand (starting 29 October)

Events
19 January – Georges Claude patents the neon discharge tube for use in advertising.
27 January – French military casualties begin arriving at the Hôpital Temporaire d'Arc-en-Barrois, established earlier in the month by British volunteers.
2 April – Croix de guerre instituted as a military decoration.
18 April – Roland Garros lands his aircraft behind enemy lines and is taken prisoner.
9 May – Second Battle of Artois starts.
15 May – Second Battle of Artois ends in stalemate.
July – Adrian helmet first issued to the French Army.
10 September – Satirical weekly newspaper Le Canard enchaîné first published.
15 September – Third Battle of Artois begins.
25 September
Battle of Loos begins, a major British offensive on the Western Front; first British use of poison gas during World War I.
Second Battle of Champagne begins.
28 September – Battle of Loos ends with British retreat.
16 October – France declares war on Bulgaria.
4 November – Third Battle of Artois ends.
6 November – Second Battle of Champagne ends.

Sport

Births

January to March
13 January – Antoine Guillaumont, archaeologist and Syriac scholar (died 2000)
14 January – André Frossard, journalist and essayist (died 1995)
18 February – Marcel Landowski, composer, biographer and arts administrator (died 1999)
1 March – Gustave Choquet, mathematician (died 2006)
7 March – Jacques Chaban-Delmas, Gaullist politician and Prime Minister (died 2000)
24 March – Eugène Martin, motor racing driver (died 2006)

April to June
2 April – Jean Sauvagnargues, politician and Minister (died 2002)
3 April – Paul Touvier, convicted of crime against humanity for collaborationism in Vichy France (died 1996)
20 April – Émile Muller, politician (died 1988)
6 May – Achille Zavatta, clown and circus operator (died 1993)
12 May – Frère Roger, founder of the Taizé community (died 2005)
21 June – Jean Bastien, soccer player (died 1969)

July to December
31 July – Henri Decaë, cinematographer (died 1987)
19 August – Alphonse Antoine, cyclist (died 1999)
22 October – Jules Bigot, soccer player and manager (died 2007)
22 October – Jean Despeaux, boxer, Olympic gold-medallist (died 1989)
9 November – André François, cartoonist (died 2005)
12 November – Roland Barthes, literary critic and philosopher (died 1980)
17 November – Michel Arnaud, General (died 1990)
November – Jean Neuberth, abstract painter (died 1966)
17 December – André Claveau, singer (died 2003)
19 December – Édith Piaf, singer (died 1963)

Deaths
8 April – Louis Pergaud, novelist (killed in action) (born 1882)
10 May – Gaston Cros, army officer and archaeologist (killed in action) (born 1861)
5 June – Henri Gaudier-Brzeska, painter and sculptor (killed in action) (born 1891)
25 July – Virginie Amélie Avegno Gautreau, socialite, model for Portrait of Madame X (born 1859)
31 August – Adolphe Pégoud, French acrobatic pilot, World War I fighter ace (killed in action) (born 1889)
15 September – Alfred Agache, painter (born 1843)
31 August – Adolphe Pégoud, acrobatic pilot, World War I fighter ace (killed in action) (born 1889)
11 October – Jean Henri Fabre, entomologist (born 1823)
25 November – Michel Bréal, philologist (born 1832)

See also
 List of French films of 1915

References

1910s in France